Wilbert Henry Hass (1906-1959) was an invertebrate paleontologist specializing in the study of conodonts. He joined the Section of Paleontology and Stratigraphy of the United States Geological Survey (USGS) in 1930 when he was appointed Junior Scientific Aid. He was promoted to the rank of Geologist in 1940 and remained with the USGS for the remainder of his life.

Work 
 Morphology of Conodonts. Wilbert H. Hass, 1941 
 Orientation of the Crystal Units of Conodonts. Wilbert H. Hass and Marie L. Lindberg, 1946 
 Conodonts of the Barnett Formation of Texas. Wilbert H. Hass, 1952

In 1959, he described the conodont genus Dollymae and the conodont families Balognathidae, Cyrtoniodontidae and Spathognathodontidae from the Chappel limestone of Texas.

Tributes 
The conodont species name Dollymae hassi is a tribute to WH Hass.

References

External links 
 Wilbert Henry Hass at the Smithsonian Institution Archives website (retrieved 3 July 2016)

20th-century American geologists
Conodont specialists
1906 births
1959 deaths
20th-century American zoologists